Tobizaru Masaya (翔猿 正也, born April 24, 1992, as ) is a professional sumo wrestler from Japan and wrestles for Oitekaze stable. He made his top division debut in September 2020 and his san'yaku debut in November 2022.

He is the brother of active wrestler Hidenoumi of the Kise stable; they became the 18th pair of sekitori brothers in sumo history. Despite the fact that they are in different stables, Tobizaru will not face him in competition as Japan Sumo Association rules prevent close relatives from being matched against each other outside of playoff bouts.

Career
Masaya Iwasaki followed his elder brother Takuya into sumo, joining the same sumo club in his first year of elementary school. He was also interested in baseball, and had thoughts of becoming a professional baseball player, but gave up the game for sumo when he started junior high school. The future Hokutofuji was a contemporary of his at high school. He studied economics at Nihon University and was a member of their sumo team, but weighing only around 110 kg and having to sit out a year with an ankle injury he did not manage to win any major amateur titles. Deciding to turn professional, he opted not to join his brother who was already a sekitori at Kise stable, preferring the challenge of making his way on his own. Instead he joined Oitekaze stable, also home to Endō who was two years his senior at university. He made his debut in January 2015, competing under his family name of Iwasaki. Upon reaching the jūryō division after the May 2017 tournament he changed his shikona to Tobizaru (literally "Flying Monkey") as he was born in the year of the monkey and he considers his darting  movement in the sumo ring similar to a monkey. He recorded only six wins and nine losses in his jūryō debut in July and was demoted back to makushita in September 2017. His 5–2 record at Makushita 2 in the September tournament would normally have been good enough for an immediate re-promotion, but there were only two openings and priority went to Takagenji and Takanoshō. Tobizaru had to wait until the March 2018 tournament to return to jūryō, but he has maintained his sekitori status ever since.

Tobizaru earned promotion to the top makuuchi division for the September 2020 tournament after a 9–6 record at Jūryō 2 in July. He and Hidenoumi became the 11th pair of brothers to both have reached makuuchi. Tobizaru said he hoped his brother would be able to earn promotion back to makuuchi.  He was also the tenth member of Oitekaze stable to reach makuuchi since its founding, the last being Tsurugishō in September 2019. In his makuuchi debut he came close to becoming the first wrestler since Ryōgoku Kajinosuke II in 1914 to win the championship in his first top division tournament, needing to beat Shōdai on the final day to force a playoff, but he was defeated and finished with a 11–4 record. He was awarded the Fighting Spirit prize.

Tobizaru earned the first kinboshi of his career when he defeated yokozuna Terunofuji on the second day of the September 2022 tournament. Due to his strong showing in the September 2022 tournament, finishing with ten wins, Tobizaru was promoted to komusubi for November, his debut in the junior san'yaku ranks. At the November tournament he finished with a losing 7–8 record.

In January 2023 rankings Tobizaru was demoted from komusubi and started the New Year tournament as maegashira 1. In the January tournament he secured a winning record on the 15th day with a win over Kotoekō. In the March rankings he was again promoted to komusubi.

Fighting style
He is an oshi-sumo specialist, preferring to push his opponents rather than grab the mawashi or belt. He likes to pull his opponents down at the edge of the ring, with a high percentage of his victories being by hataki-komi (slap down) and hiki-otoshi (pull down). He is also good at kicks and leg sweeps. His style is fast-paced, and he regularly sidestepped at the initial charge when in jūryō, but in his makuuchi debut made a conscious effort to fight more on the offensive.

Career record

See also
Glossary of sumo terms
List of active sumo wrestlers
List of komusubi
Active special prize winners

References

External links
 

1992 births
Living people
Japanese sumo wrestlers
Sumo people from Tokyo
Nihon University alumni
Komusubi